Vere Lorrimer (8 June 1920 – 1 October 1998) was a British television producer and director.

His work as director included many BBC dramas including Compact, Dixon of Dock Green, Doomwatch and Blake's 7.

He later moved on to producing, overseeing the final series of Blake's 7 in 1981, the second series of Tenko in 1982 and the drama serials The Dark Side of the Sun and Maelstrom. He also had a cameo as a tour guide in the 1988 Doctor Who serial Silver Nemesis.

External links

1920 births
1998 deaths
BBC television producers
British television directors
British television producers